Paranicomia leucoma is a species of beetle in the family Cerambycidae. It was described by Lacordaire in 1872.

References

Apomecynini
Beetles described in 1872